The Ministry of Women and Child Development, a branch of the Government of India, is an apex body for formulation and administration of the rules and regulations and laws relating to women and child development in India. The current minister for the Ministry of Women and Child Development is Smriti Irani having held the portfolio since 31 May 2019.

History
The Department of Women and Child Development was set up in the year 1985 as a part of the Ministry of Human Resource Development to give the much needed impetus to the holistic development of women and children. With effect from 30 January 2006, the Department has been upgraded to a Ministry.

Mandate
The broad mandate of  Ministry is to have holistic development of Women and Children. As a nodal Ministry for the advancement of women and children, the Ministry formulates plans, policies and programmes; enacts/ amends legislation, guides and coordinates the efforts of both governmental and non-governmental organisations working in the field of Women and Child Development. Besides, playing its nodal role, the Ministry implements certain innovative programmes for women and children. These programmes cover welfare and support services, training for employment and income generation, awareness generation and gender sensitization. These programmes play a supplementary and complementary role to the other general developmental programmes in the sectors of health, education, rural development etc. All these efforts are directed to ensure that women are empowered both economically and socially and thus become equal partners in national development along with men.

Policy initiatives
For holistic into development of the child, the Ministry has been implementing the world's largest outreach programme of Integrated Child Development Services (ICDS) providing a package of services comprising supplementary nutrition, immunization, health check-up and referral services, pre-school non-formal education. There is effective coordination and monitoring of various sectoral programmes. Most of the programmes of the Ministry are run through non-governmental organisations. Efforts are made to have more effective involvement of NGOs.  The major policy initiatives undertaken by the Ministry in into the recent past include universalisation of ICDS and Kishori Shakti Yojana, launching a nutrition programme for adolescent girls, establishment of the Commission for protection of Child Rights and enactment of Protection of Women from Domestic Violence Act.

The ministry also gives the annual Stree Shakti Puraskar in six categories, namely Devi Ahilya Bai Holkar, Kannagi Award, Mata Jijabai Award, Rani Gaidinliu Zeliang Award, Rani Lakshmi Bai Award and Rani Rudramma Devi (for both men & women).

Organisation
The Ministry of Women and Child Development is headed by Smt. Smriti Irani, Minister; Mr. Indevar Pandey is the Secretary of the Ministry of Women and Child Development.  The activities of the Ministry are undertaken through seven bureaux. 
The Ministry has 6 autonomous organizations working under its aegis. 
National Institute of Public Cooperation and Child Development (NIPCCD) 
National Commission for Women (NCW)
National Commission for Protection of Child Rights (NCPCR) 
Central Adoption Resource Authority (CARA) 
Central Social Welfare Board (CSWB) 
Rashtriya Mahila Kosh (RMK) 
NIPCCD and RMK are societies registered under the Societies Registration Act, 1860. CSWB is a charitable company registered
under section 25 of the Indian Companies Act, 1956. These organisations are fully funded by the Govt. of India and they assist
the Department in its functions including implementation of some programmes/schemes. The National Commission for Women was constituted 
as a national apex statutory body in 1992 for protecting and safeguarding the rights of women. The National Commission for
Protection of Child Rights which is a national level apex statutory body constituted in the March 2007 for protecting and safe
guarding the rights of children. Central Adoption Resource Authority is the national central authority for regulating Inter-country 
Adoptions and facilitating domestic adoptions. CARA became a Statutory Body under the provisions of the Juvenile Justice
(Care and Protection of Children) Act, 2015.

Subjects allocated to the ministry
Integrated Child Protection Scheme
Welfare of the family.
References from the United Nations National Nutrition Policy, national Plan of Action for Nutrition and National Nutrition Mission. 
Charitable and religious endowments pertaining to subjects allocated to this Department 
Promotion and development of voluntary effort on the subjects allocated to this Department 
Implementation of - 
Immoral Traffic in Women and Girl Act. 1956 (as amended up to 1986) .
The Indecent Representation of Women (Prevention) Act, 1986 (60 of 1986).
The Dowry Prohibition Act. 1961 (28 of 1961) 
The Commission of Sati (Prevention) Act, 1987 (3 of 1988), excluding the administration of criminal justice in regard to offences under these Acts.
Implementation of the Infant Milk Substitutes, Feeding Bottles and Infant Food (Regulation of Production, Supply and Distribution) Act, 1992 (41 of 1992).
Coordination of activities of Cooperative for Assistance and Relief Everywhere (CARE)
Planning, Research, Evaluation, Monitoring, Project Formulations, Statistics and Training relating to the welfare and development of women and children, including development of gender sensitive data base.
United Nations Children's Fund (UNICEF)
Central Social Welfare Board (CSWB)
National Institute of Public Cooperation and Child Development (NIPCCD)
Food and Nutrition Board
Food and Nutrition Board (FNB)
Development and popularization of subsidiary and protective foods.
Nutrition extension.
Women’s Empowerment and Gender Equality.
National Commission for Women.
Rashtriya Mahila Kosh (RMK)
The Juvenile Justice (Care and Protection of Children) Act, 2015.
Probation of Juvenile offenders.
Issues relating to adoption, Central Adoption Resource Agency and Child Help Line (Childline).
The Children Act, 1960 (60 of 1960).
The Child Marriage – Restraint Act, 1929 (19 of 1929).

List of Ministers

List of Ministers of State

See also 
 Integrated Child Protection Scheme
 Odisha State Child Protection Society
 The Indira Gandhi Matritva Sahyog Yojana (IGMSY)

References

External links
 

Women and Child Development
India, Women and Child Development
Women in India
India, Women and Child Development
1985 establishments in India
Child welfare in India
Ministries established in 1985
Women's rights in India